Pataq (also Romanized as Pāţāq, Pā-ye Ţāq, and Pa yi Tāq) is a village in Beshiva Pataq Rural District, in the Central District of Sarpol-e Zahab County, Kermanshah Province, Iran. At the 2006 census, its population was 315, in 86 families.

See also
Taq-e Gara

References 

Populated places in Sarpol-e Zahab County